Laurenson is a surname. Notable people with the surname include:

George Laurenson (1857–1913), New Zealand politician
James Laurenson (born 1940), New Zealand actor
Tom Laurenson (1906–1969), Australian rules footballer

Given name 
Laurenson is rare as a given name. People with the given name include:

Robert Laurenson Dashiell Davidson (1909–1998), American philatelist